Caldalkalibacillus thermarum is a Gram-positive, thermophilic and alkaliphilic bacterium from the genus of Caldalkalibacillus which has been isolated from a hot spring from Tengchong in China.

References

External links
Type strain of Caldalkalibacillus thermarum at BacDive -  the Bacterial Diversity Metadatabase

Bacillaceae
Bacteria described in 2006